Aflacts is an advertising slogan created by Aflac and Kaplan Thaler and introduced in April 2009 to broaden awareness about the specific benefits of the insurance products the company offers.  The campaign, "Get the Aflacts," came about as the company's Aflac Duck campaign had built widespread recognition for the brand.  The goal of the campaign is to connect prospective customers, who were familiar with the brand, with how Aflac products could actually help during times of financial hardship as the result of unexpected medical events.

In conjunction with the campaign, Aflac created new policies—and revised existing policies—to expand availability to more businesses, individuals, and prospective policyholders of different age groups.  According to Aflac, senior vice president and chief marketing officer Jeff Charney, "We are making room for more people under our wing."

Campaign

An article in The New York Times said the Aflacts campaign gave the Aflac Duck "a more prominent role," designed to "help potential customers learn the [...] facts about policies and other products."

To help define the main advantages of Aflac policies, the initial set of "Aflacts" included statements such as:

"Aflac is different from health insurance; it's insurance for daily living. Major medical pays for doctors, hospitals and prescriptions. Aflac is insurance for daily living. It pays cash benefits directly to you, unless otherwise assigned, to help with daily expenses due to an illness or accident.
"Aflac belongs to you, not your company. When you have an Aflac policy, it's yours. You own it. Even if you change jobs or retire, you can take your Aflac policy with you with no increase in premiums."

References

External links
Aflacts
Aflac Duck on Facebook

American advertising slogans
American television commercials
2000s television commercials
Advertising campaigns
2009 neologisms